The Hill Fort of Kesroli is a 14th-century fort located in Alwar district, Rajasthan, India. It is now a heritage hotel managed by Neemrana Hotels group., known for its turrets, ramparts, and arched verandahs and today considered one of the best heritage hotels in India.

History

It was built in the 14th century by the Yaduvanshi Rajputs, who are said to be descendants of Lord Krishna. They were then named Khanzadas after having converted to Islam in the middle of the 14th century.

Through the centuries, the seven-turreted fort has changed hands many times. It has been conquered by the Mughals and the Jats and it then finally came into the hands of the Rajputs in 1775, at the time the princely state of Alwar was founded. The fort knew a golden period under Ranawat Thakur Bhawani Singh (1882–1934).

In 2004, the fort was leased to heritage company Neemrana Hotels by Wing Cdr. Mangal Singh. Subsequently, it was restored by co-owners of the group and restorers, Aman Nath and Francis Wacziarg.

Description
The Hill Fort of Kesroli is a 31-room hotel.

References

External links
 Hill Fort Kesroli, website

Forts in Rajasthan
Heritage hotels in India
Tourist attractions in Alwar district
Hotels in Rajasthan
14th-century establishments in India